Mangu-dong is a dong, neighbourhood of Jungnang-gu in Seoul, South Korea.

See also 
Administrative divisions of South Korea

References

External links
 Jungnang-gu official website in English
 Tourism of Jungnang-gu at the Jungnang-gu official website
 Mangu bon-dong resident office website

Neighbourhoods of Jungnang District